Georges Augustin Eugène Saillard (5 July 1877 – 11 September 1967) was a French film actor. He starred in some 52 films between 1909 and 1950.

Saillard was married to actress . He died on 11 September 1967 in Versailles, he is buried in Cimetière des Gonards.

Filmography
 Maitre Cornelius (1910)
 L'Honneur (1910)
 Cesar Birotteau (1911)
 L'Auberge Rouge (1912)
 La Voleuse (1912)
 Conscience de l'enfant (1912)
 Au-delà des lois humaines (1920)
 Colette the Unwanted (1927)
 Honeymoon Trip (1933)
 Golgotha (1935)
 Beethoven's Great Love (1937)
 Yoshiwara (1937)
 The Citadel of Silence (1937)
 J'accuse! (1938)
 Ramuntcho (1938)
 Thérèse Martin (1939)
 Orvert (1955)

References

External links 

1877 births
1967 deaths
French male film actors
French male silent film actors
20th-century French male actors